The 1943 All-Eastern football team consists of American football players chosen by various selectors as the best players at each position among the Eastern colleges and universities during the 1943 college football season.

All-Eastern selections

Backs
 Bob Odell, Penn (AP-1)
 Harold Hamberg, Navy (AP-1)
 Donald Kaspzak, Dartmouth (AP-1)
 Mike Micka, Colgate (AP-1)

Ends
 John F. Monahan, Dartmouth (AP-1)
 Albert Channell, Navy (AP-1)

Tackles
 George Connor, Holy Cross (AP-1)
 Francis E. Merritt, Army (AP-1)

Guards
 George Brown, Navy (AP-1)
 John Jaffurs, Penn State (AP-1)

Centers
 Cas Myslinski, Army (AP-1)

Key
 AP = Associated Press

See also
 1943 College Football All-America Team

References

All-Eastern
All-Eastern college football teams